Relentless is the fifth studio album from Jackyl. It is the first album to feature the new personnel line-up.

Track listing
All songs written by Jesse James Dupree unless noted.
"If You Want It Heavy (I Weigh a Ton)" - 2:22
"I'm on Fire" - 3:10
"Kill the Sunshine" (Brian Johnson, Jesse James Dupree) – 3:31
"Lend Me a Hand" - 4:22
"Mr. Evil" (Dupree, Glick, Worley, Worley) - 3:47
"Vegas Smile" - 3:26
"Heaven Don't Want Me (And Hell's Afraid I'll Take Over)" - 4:00
"Down This Road Before" - 3:34
"Billy Badass" - 2:59
"Sparks From Candy" - 3:28
"Curse on You" - 4:33
"The More You Hate It" (Dupree, Dupree) - 1:53

2002 albums
Jackyl albums